The Secret Diary of Adrian Mole, Aged 13¾ is a British television series based on the book of the same name written by Sue Townsend. It began in 1985, and starred Gian Sammarco as the title character Adrian Mole, Stephen Moore as Adrian's father George Mole and Julie Walters as Adrian's mother Pauline Mole.

It was directed by Peter Sasdy.

Characters

Mole family
Adrian Mole (Gian Sammarco) is the main character of the series and also serves as narrator.  His character on screen is shown wearing spectacles as well as wearing ties often when not at school, points not mentioned in the book.
George Mole (Stephen Moore) is Adrian's father, married to Adrian's mother Pauline.
Pauline Mole (Julie Walters) is Adrian's mother, who leaves her husband George to live with her neighbour Mr. Lucas in Sheffield. Walters was replaced by Lulu for series two.
May 'Grandma' Mole (Beryl Reid) is George Mole's mother and Adrian's grandmother.

Other characters
Bert Baxter (Bill Fraser) is Adrian's foul-mouthed and strongly opinionated friend, an old age pensioner whom Adrian has to look after as part of a school club of which he is part. Bert owns an aggressive and unpredictable German Shepherd dog named Sabre, whom Adrian strongly dislikes.
Queenie Baxter (Doris Hare) is Bert Baxter's partner, who later becomes his wife.
Pandora Braithwaite (Lindsey Stagg) is Adrian's girlfriend.
Tania Braithwaite (Louise Jameson) is Pandora's liberal-minded mother.
Ivan Braithwaite (Robin Herford) is Pandora's father.
Nigel Partridge (Steven Mackintosh) is Adrian's best friend.
Barry Kent (Chris Gascoyne) is a bully at Adrian's school who beats Adrian up in exchange for money, until Adrian's grandmother puts a stop to it.
Mr 'Creep' Lucas (Paul Greenwood) is the Moles' former neighbour with whom Pauline has an affair in series 1.
Doreen 'Stick Insect' Slater (Su Elliot) is a woman with whom Adrian's father George has an affair while his wife is in Sheffield with Mr. Lucas.
Maxwell 'House' Slater (Anthony Watson) is Stick Insect's badly-behaved young son from a previous relationship.
Dr Grey (Bill Wallis) is the family's jobsworth local doctor, whose bedside manner is generally rude and unsympathetic.
Mr Reginald 'Popeye' Scruton (Freddie Jones) is Adrian and Pandora's abrasive and volatile headmaster, who is a huge admirer of the then Prime Minister Margaret Thatcher.
Ms Fossington-Gore (Mary Maddox) is Adrian, Pandora and Nigel's opinionated but supportive form tutor.
Mrs Claricoates (Marian Diamond) is the school's kind-hearted and long-suffering secretary.
Hamish Mancini (Craig Souza) is an American teenager whom Adrian befriends during his barge-holiday with his mother and 'Creep' Lucas.

In addition, Brenda Cowling appeared in two episodes as the formidable matron of the Alderman Cooper Sunshine Home, in which Bert and Queenie were residents before their marriage.

Some characters and places featured from the book are omitted in the TV series and parts of the diary entries mentioned with omitted characters are substituted by others (e.g. Rick Lemon is not featured but references to diary entries where he was featured have other characters fill in such as Ms Fossington-Gore.  Another example is when Adrian goes to Scotland with his mother and Mr Lucas, this is changed to a river barge holiday in England.

Episodes

Location

The series was mainly filmed on location in the Braunstone and South Wigston areas of Leicester. The Moles' house and street were actually filmed in Ludlow Close, South Harrow and Adrian's school scenes at 'Neil Armstrong Comprehensive' were all filmed at Hammersmith School in West London (now Phoenix High). Whilst being set in Leicester, which is in the East Midlands, some of the characters speak with a distinct West Midlands accent (e.g. Birmingham, Coventry, etc.).

Music

The opening and closing theme was "Profoundly In Love With Pandora" by Ian Dury. It was released as a single in October 1985 and reached number 45 on the UK Singles Chart.

References

External links
 

ITV television dramas
1985 British television series debuts
1985 British television series endings
1980s British comedy-drama television series
Adrian Mole
Television shows produced by Thames Television
English-language television shows
Television series about families
Television series about teenagers
Television series by Fremantle (company)
Television series set in 1981
Television series set in 1982